Calcinus seurati, commonly known as Seurat's hermit crab or whitebanded hermit, is a species of hermit crab in the family Diogenidae. It was first described by French carcinologist Jacques Forest in 1951.

Description
Walking legs banded black and white, claws light or dark gray.

Range
Found in high intertidal pools in the Pacific Ocean, from the Hawaiian Islands to Taiwan.

References

External links
Whitebanded Hermit Crab

Diogenidae
Crustaceans of the Pacific Ocean
Crustaceans described in 1951